Kibatalia elmeri is a species of plant in the family Apocynaceae. It is endemic to the island of Luzon in the Philippines.

References

Endemic flora of the Philippines
elmeri
Taxonomy articles created by Polbot

Critically endangered flora of Asia